Fitting Master is a 2009 Indian Telugu-language action film directed by E. V. V. Satyanarayana, featuring his son Allari Naresh in the lead titular role of Fitting Master, along with Madalsa Sharma, Sayaji Shinde, Chandra Mohan, Ali, Srinivasa Reddy and Amit Tiwari in the lead roles. The film released on 14 January 2009, along with getting mixed reviews from critics. The film was able to do well and was an Average at the box office.

Synopsis
Sampath AKA Fitting Master (Allari Naresh) is a gym trainer, who tries to avoid Meghna (Madalsa Sharma), a girl who falls in love with him, after she is rescued by him. She wants to marry him, but he avoids her, saying he won't be able to keep her happy, after which she calls her brother (Amit Tiwari) from United States to India to make Sampath ready for Marriage. On the day of his arrival, he gets murdered. After a policeman (Sayaji Shinde) starts investigating, Meghna begins to doubt Sampath, and she finds out that he had killed her brother, after which Sampath reveals her brother's truth. Meghna's brother and 2 of his friends had embarrassed Sampath's sister by posting dirty videos of her in the internet. One of the friends had pretended to fall in love with her and she ran away with him due to which her mother dies of a heart attack. After 2 weeks, the groom's friend blackmails Sampath's sister with her first night video. She relents and 3 friends rape her one after another. When she cries out this to her husband, he tells her that his friends film them. Because of this the girl commits suicide. When Sampath's and the girl's father come to know of it he too commits suicide. Sampath had gotten angry on this and decided to take revenge. He had made Meghna purposefully fall in love with him and it was he who got his friend to tell Meghna to call her brother. When her brother revealed that he and his parents were actually against the marriage, Sampath overpowers the guy and guns him down. He now kills the other 2 as well. In the end, when Meghna again tries to convince him of her love, he refuses saying that her parents will never forgive their son's killer and that he cannot stay in the house with that guilt. He tells her to listen to her parents and they are her well wishers. As she begins to cry at losing him, he goes out of the house with tears in his eyes.

Cast
Allari Naresh as Sampath aka Fitting Master
Madalsa Sharma as Meghna
Chandra Mohan as Sampath's father
Sudha as Sampath's mother
Sayaji Shinde as Police officer
Amit Tiwari as Meghna's brother
Pavitra Lokesh as Meghna's mother
Ali as Bose, He's the boss
Rao Ramesh
Srinivasa Reddy
Khayyum as Sampath's friend
Chalapathi Rao as Bose's assistant
Jaya Prakash Reddy as Bose's assistant
Surekha Vani as Journalist
Krishna Bhagavan as News reporter
Prudhviraj as Police Officer
Ravi Prakash as Ashok
Saira Banu as Sampath's sister

Soundtrack
The Music Was Composed By Chinna and Released by Aditya Music.

Reception
Fitting Master received mixed reviews from critics. 123telugu rated it 3/5. Greatandhra rated it 2.5/5. Fullyhyd rated it 2/5. Rediff rated it 2/5.

Box office
Since the film had mixed responses from critics, along with Allari Naresh's Action Hero Image in the film, the film managed to do average business at the box office and emerged as a Moderate Commercial Success

References

Indian action films
Films directed by E. V. V. Satyanarayana
2009 action films
2009 films